The Anna and Lajos Erdős Prize in Mathematics is a prize given by the Israel Mathematical Union to an Israeli mathematician (in any field of mathematics and computer science), "with preference to candidates up to the age of 40."  The prize was established by Paul Erdős in 1977 in honor of his parents, and is awarded annually or biannually.  The name was changed from "Erdős Prize" in 1996, after Erdős's death, to reflect his original wishes.

Erdős Prize recipients

See also 
 List of things named after Paul Erdős
 List of mathematics awards

References

Mathematics awards
Awards established in 1977
Israeli awards
Lists of Israeli award winners
Israeli science and technology awards